State Route 17 (SR-17) is a state highway in southern Utah, running for  in Washington County from La Verkin to Anderson Junction near Toquerville.  It serves as a shortcut from I-15 to Zion National Park.

Route description
The route begins at the junction of State Street and 500 North in the center of La Verkin and heads north on the latter, a two-lane undivided highway. After exiting La Verkin, the road turns northwest. South of Toquerville, the route curves between a north-northeast and north-northwest direction before steadying to a north-northeast direction. The route turns north-northwest and enters Toquerville as Toquer Boulevard. Exiting the town, the highway turns to the southwest briefly before turning north-northwest. The route turns west-northwest one final time before reverting to its original direction and terminating at exit 27 on I-15 at Anderson Junction, a diamond interchange.

History
Until 1969, SR-17 and SR-9 (then SR-15) were swapped, with SR-15 following current SR-17 and SR-17 connecting US-91 at Harrisburg Junction with SR-15 at La Verkin Junction. The present SR-17 was added to the state highway system in 1912 and numbered as part of SR-15 in the 1920s.

Major intersections

See also

 List of state highways in Utah

References

External links

017
 017